The Taipei Representative Office in the UK (TRO) is the diplomatic mission of the Republic of China (Taiwan) in the United Kingdom (UK). It is not a fully-fledged embassy owing to the ongoing Taiwan dispute and One-China policy. However, it is the highest-level representation of the ROC government in the United Kingdom. It manages cultural, economic and political cooperation between the UK and the ROC, as well as offering consular services. Its counterpart body in Taiwan is the British Office Taipei.

History
The Republic of China's former diplomatic mission to the UK was the Chinese Embassy, inherited from the former Qing Empire. After the Chinese Civil War of 1949, for a short time the UK continued to recognise the government of Republic of China as the sole legitimate government of China, before switching recognition to the People's Republic of China (PRC) in 1950. The ROC office in London was first established in September 1963 as the Free Chinese Centre. In 1992, it adopted its present name.

Organizational structure
 Consular Division
 Culture Division
 Economic Division
 Education Division
 Financial Division
 Overseas Compatriots Division
 Press Division
 Science and Technology Division

Representatives
 Eugene Chien (1993–1997)
 Tzen Wen-hua
 Tien Hung-mao (2002–2004)
 Edgar Lin (2004–2007)
 Katharine Chang (2007–2011)
 Shen Lyu-shun (15 December 2011 to 31 March 2014)
 Liu Chih-kung (July 2014 to 2016)
 David Lin (July 2016 to July 2020)
 Kelly Hsieh (since July 2020)

Transportation
The nearest station to the representative office is London Victoria station.

Branch offices
 Edinburgh

Consular districts

See also
 List of diplomatic missions in the United Kingdom
 Taipei Economic and Cultural Representative Office
 List of diplomatic missions of Taiwan
 British Office Taipei

References

External links

 Official site
 
 

Taiwan
United Kingdom
Taiwan–United Kingdom relations
Buildings and structures in the City of Westminster
Victoria, London